Belén is a town in the Concepción Department of Paraguay.

Populated places in Concepción Department, Paraguay